Irene Temple Bailey (February 24, 1869 – July 6, 1953) was a popular American novelist and short story writer.

Beginning around 1902, Temple Bailey was contributing stories to national magazines such as The Saturday Evening Post, Cavalier Magazine, Cosmopolitan, The American Magazine, McClure's, Woman's Home Companion, Good Housekeeping, McCall's and others. 

In 1914, Bailey wrote the screenplay for the Vitagraph Studios film Auntie, and two of her novels were filmed. She also had three of her books on the list of bestselling novels in the United States in 1918, 1922, and 1926 as determined by Publishers Weekly.

Bailey never married.  She died at her apartment in Washington, D.C. on July 6, 1953.  Her obituary in the New York Post estimated that her novels had sold three million copies, making her among the best paid writers in the world, and that Cosmopolitan had once given her $325,000 for three serial novels and a group of short stories.

Bibliography

Judy  (1907)
Glory of Youth  (1913)
Contrary Mary  (1914)
A Girl's Courage  (1916)
Adventures in Girlhood  (1917)
Mistress Anne  (1917)
 The Tin Soldier  (1918) - No.8 for the year 1919 in the U.S.
Trumpeter Swan  (1920)
The Gay Cockade (1921)
The Dim Lantern  (1922) - No.5 for the year 1923 in the U.S.
Peacock Feathers  (1924) - made into a motion picture
Holly Hedge, and other Christmas stories  (1925)
The Blue Window  (1926) - No.10 for the year 1926 in the U.S.
Wallflowers  (1927)  - made into a motion picture
Silver Slippers  (1928)
Star in the Well; a Christmas story  (1928)
Burning Beauty  (1929)
Wild Wind  (1930)
So this Is Christmas  (1931)
Little Girl Lost  (1932)
Enchanted Ground  (1933)
Radiant tree, and other stories  (1934)
Fair as the Moon  (1935)
I've Been To London  (1937)
Tomorrow's Promise  (1938)The Blue Cloak (1941)Pink Camellia  (1942)Red Fruit  (1945)

FilmographyAuntie (1914)Peacock Feathers (1925)Wallflowers'' (1928)

References

External links 

 
 
 
 

1869 births
1953 deaths
20th-century American novelists
20th-century American short story writers
20th-century American women writers
American women screenwriters
American women novelists
American women short story writers
People from Petersburg, Virginia
20th-century American screenwriters